Health Capsules is a comic strip syndicated by United Feature Syndicate since February 20, 1961. The comic panel answers reader's health-related questions, accompanied by a humorous illustration. Health Capsules is currently produced by Bron Smith.

Publication history 
Health Capsules was originally produced by Dr. Michael A. Petti and cartoonist Jud Hurd, beginning in 1961 until 2002, when it was taken over by Bron Smith.

Hurd was awarded the National Cartoonist Society Special Features Award for Health Capsules in 1978.

Contents 
GoComics characterizes Health Capsules this way:

Each comic ends with the caption "Health Capsules is not intended to be diagnostic in nature."

References

External links 
 Health Capsules at GoComics
 Health Capsules section of Bron Smith's website

1961 comics debuts
Non-fiction comic strips
Educational comics
American comic strips